Richard Heyrick (1600 – 1667) was a Church of England clergyman and divine who served as warden of Manchester Collegiate Church.

Life 
Richard Heyrick, born in London on 9 September 1600, was cousin to Robert Herrick the poet, and son of Sir William Hericke, alderman and goldsmith of London, who purchased Beaumanor, Leicestershire. He was educated at Merchant Taylors' School, London, and at St. John's College, Oxford, where he entered as a commoner in 1617. He graduated BA on 19 October 1619, and MA on 26 June 1622. He is also styled BD. By special recommendation of the King he was elected fellow of All Souls College on 14 January 1624–5. About that time he took orders, and was instituted on 9 June 1626 to the rectory of North Repps, Norfolk. There had been many money transactions between James I and Heyrick's father, and by way of settlement of a loan Sir William received for his son the reversion of the wardenship of Manchester Collegiate Church, which was granted by Charles I by letters patent of 14 November 1626. Heyrick succeeded to the wardenship in 1635, but not without some preliminary difficulty, which Archbishop Laud claimed the credit of overcoming.

In 1641 he published Three Sermons preached at the Collegiate Church in Manchester, 8vo, in which he denounced with bitter prejudice and vindictive sarcasm Romanists and High Episcopalians. He identified himself with the Presbyterians, and eventually became the chief pillar of that party in Lancashire. In 1642 he drew up an address from the county of Lancaster to Charles I, containing what was in effect an offer to mediate between the King and Parliament for peace and reconciliation. On 23 April of the same year Heyrick, who had about that time taken the Covenant, was appointed by Parliament one of the divines for Lancashire to be consulted about Church government, the other being Charles Herle, rector of Winwick; and on 9 October 1643 he was one of the ministers appointed by the House of Commons to decide upon the orthodoxy and maintenance of Lancashire ministers. He was the main instrument in establishing throughout Lancashire the Presbyterian system in 1646, and wrote the Harmonious Consent of the Ministers within the County Palatine of Lancaster with their Reverend Brethren the Ministers of the Province of London, &c., 1648, 4to. Along with Richard Hollinworth, he acted as moderator of the Lancashire synod, and in the affairs of the Manchester classis his influence was predominant, and his care in all matters, especially in providing useful and pious ministers, was conspicuous. As a member of the assembly of divines he preached before the House of Commons on 27 May 1646. In this sermon, afterwards printed with the title of Queen Esther's Resolves; or a Princely Pattern of Heaven-born Resolution, he makes pathetic mention of the services of Manchester in the cause of God and the Kingdom, and of the impoverished condition of the Church's ministers in that town. He was a zealous co-operator in the work of the collegiate chapter, and a sturdy defender of its rights whenever assailed. By his remonstrance he procured the restoration of the Church revenues which had been taken away by Parliament in 1645. On the dissolution of the collegiate body in 1650, he was allowed to retain his position as one of the town's ministers, at a salary of 100l. In 1657–8 he took an active part in the proceedings described in a volume entitled The Censures of the Church Revived, 4to, 1659, occasioned by the Rev. Isaac Allen, rector of Prestwich, with others, disputing the authority of the Manchester classis in matters of Church discipline.

He was consistent in his loyalty to the King, strongly protesting on several occasions against the growing power and republican principles of the Independents. In 1651 he was arrested for being implicated in Love's plot for the restoration of Charles II. He was imprisoned in London, but through the influence, it is supposed, of George Booth, 1st Lord Delamere, was pardoned and released. When Booth rose in Cheshire in 1659 Heyrick, although sympathetic, was irresolute in action, like many other ministers. He hailed the Restoration with enthusiasm in a sermon preached on 23 April 1661, and afterwards published without his authority. He complied with the Act of Uniformity by "reading the service book" on 14 September 1662, and maintained his position of warden until his death, having no doubt moderated his religious tenets. Before 1662 he had held, along with the Manchester wardenship, the rectory of Thornton-in-the-Moors, near Chester. He also held the rectory of Ashton-upon-Mersey, Cheshire, from 14 July 1640 to 1642.

He was twice married: first, when he was at North Repps, to Helen, daughter of Thomas Corbet of Sprowston, Norfolk, by whom he had seven children; and secondly, in 1642, to Anna Maria Hall, a widow, daughter of Erasmus Breton of Hamburg. By his second wife he had six children.

He died on 6 August 1667, aged 67, and was buried in the choir of the Manchester Collegiate Church, a long Latin epitaph, written by his old friend Thomas Case, being inscribed on his monument. The eulogy is extravagant; but Heyrick was a fair scholar, an eloquent preacher, and a conscientious man, if somewhat impetuous in temper. Henry Newcome, in dedicating his book, the Sinner's Hope, 1660, to Heyrick, speaks in high laudation of "his much honoured brother and faithful fellow-labourer in the congregation" at Manchester.

Sources 

 Nichols's Leicestershire, iii. 159;
 Wood's Athenæ Oxonienses (Bliss), iii. 780;
 Wood's Fasti, i. 386, 406;
 Hibbert-Ware's Manchester Foundations;
 Raines's Wardens of Manchester (Chetham Society), ii. 122;
 Newcome's Diary and Autobiography (Chetham Society);
 Worthington's Diary (Chetham Society), ii. 236;
 Martindale's Diary (Chetham Society);
 Dugdale's Visitation of Lancaster (Chetham Society), ii. 138;
 Palatine Note-book, i. 19, 20, 81, 104, 155, 167, ii. 183, 233;
 Earwaker's Manchester Court Leet Records, iv. 283;
 Journals of House of Commons, iii. 270, iv. 127, v. 662, 663;
 Bibliography in Transactions of the Lancashire and Cheshire Antiquarian Society vii. 134.

Notes

References

Bibliography 

 

1600 births
1667 deaths
17th-century English Anglican priests
Clergy from Manchester
Cavaliers